Charaxes williami is a butterfly in the family Nymphalidae. It is found in northern Zambia. The habitat consists of evergreen forests.

Both sexes are attracted to fermenting fruit and fermenting sap from injured trees.

The larvae feed on Acacia amythethophylla.

References

External links
BOLD images Consortium for the Barcode of Life

Butterflies described in 2002
williami
Endemic fauna of Zambia
Butterflies of Africa